Nicholson's Obelisk, or Nicholson's Memorial, is a monument in Pakistan, erected in 1868 in honour of Brigadier-General John Nicholson, a famous military figure of the British Empire.

It is situated at the Tarnol pass or Margalla Pass) of the Margalla Hills close to the twin cities of Rawalpindi–Islamabad en route to the historical town of Taxila.

There is also a small memorial fountain at the base of the hillock on which the Memorial/Obelisk stands.

About Nicholson
Nicholson was born on 11 December 1822 in Lisburn, Ireland, the eldest son of Dr Alexander Jaffray Nicholson and Clara Hogg. He studied at The Royal School Dungannon, a public mixed school, located in Dungannon, County Tyrone, Northern Ireland.

Nicholson joined the army of the British East India Company in 1839. Soon after arriving in India, he fought his first combat action in the First Anglo-Afghan War (1839–42). After the Anglo-Afghan War, he was appointed Political Officer in Kashmir and then District Commissioner in the Sangar area of Sindh.

He fought bravely during the First Anglo-Sikh War (1845–46), during which he was wounded in an attack on the Margalla Pass, where the Obelisk in his memory now stands. He distinguished himself again in the Second Anglo-Sikh War (1848–49).

Legacy
John Nicholson became the Victorian "Hero of Delhi" and inspired several books, ballads and generations of young boys to join the army. He is referenced in numerous literary works, including Rudyard Kipling's Kim. 
Nicholson features in a number of novels about this period in history. He is mentioned by George MacDonald Fraser in his book Flashman in the Great Game. He also appears as one of the main characters in James Leasor's novel about the Indian Mutiny, Follow the Drum, describing his death in some detail. He is also featured in James Leasor's history of the siege, 'The Red Fort'. A famous biography was also written about him by Lionel J Trotter (1897) and he comes in for conspicuous mention in the book Soldier-Sahibs:The Men who made the North-West Frontier (2001) by British author Charles Allen.

Nicholson also served as Deputy Commissioner of Bannu (Khyber Pakhtunkhwa, Pakistan) from 1852-1854. For his bravery and services towards British government, a tablet in a church at Bannu  carries the following caption: “Gifted in mind and body, he was as brilliant in government as in arms. The snows of Ghazni attest his youthful fortitude; the songs of the Punjab his manly deeds; the peace of this frontier his strong rule. The enemies of his country know how terrible he was in battle, and we his friends have to recall how gentle, generous, and true he was.”

See also
 Muhammad Hayat Khan

Sources
 Edwardes, Michael (1969), Bound to Exile, Praeger, p. pp100
 Leasor, James (2011) [1956], The Red Fort, London: W. Lawrie, James Leasor Ltd, .
 Trotter, Lionel James (1897), The Life of John Nicholson: Soldier and Administrator, J. Murray, London

References

External links

Brigadier-General John Nicolson's Obelisk

Monuments and memorials in Pakistan
Obelisks in Pakistan
Buildings and structures completed in 1868
1868 establishments in British India